Holt Church is a parish church of the Church of Norway in Tvedestrand Municipality in Agder county, Norway. It is located just south of the village of Fiane. It is one of the churches for the Holt parish which is part of the Aust-Nedenes prosti (deanery) in the Diocese of Agder og Telemark. The white, stone and wood church was originally built in a long church design around the year 1100 using plans drawn up by an unknown architect (later it was converted into a cruciform design). The church seats about 430 people.

History
The earliest existing historical records of the church date back to the year 1374, but the church was likely built around the 1100. The Romanesque stone building was originally built as a rectangular nave with a narrower, rectangular choir. In 1753, the old choir was torn down and two new timber-framed wings were added, along with a new choir, giving the building a cruciform design. The architect Lars Albretsen Øvernes led this renovation.

In 1814, this church served as an election church. Together with more than 300 other parish churches across Norway, it was a polling station for elections to the 1814 Norwegian Constituent Assembly which wrote the Constitution of Norway. This was Norway's first national elections. Each church parish was a constituency that elected people called "electors" who later met together in each county to elect the representatives for the assembly that was to meet in Eidsvoll later that year.

Media gallery

See also
List of churches in Agder og Telemark

References

Tvedestrand
Churches in Agder
Stone churches in Norway
Wooden churches in Norway
Cruciform churches in Norway
12th-century churches in Norway
12th-century establishments in Norway
Norwegian election church